Epirrhoe rivata, the wood carpet, is a moth of the genus Epirrhoe in the family Geometridae. It is widespread in Europe, ranging to Armenia in the south.

References

External links

Lepidoptera of Belgium 
Lepiforum.de
Vlindernet 

rivata
Moths of Europe
Moths of Asia
Taxa named by Jacob Hübner